Deh-e Mohammad (also Romanized as Deh-e Moḩammad, Deh-i-Muhammad, and Deh Mohammad) is a village in Dastgerdan Rural District, Dastgerdan District, Tabas County, South Khorasan Province, Iran. At the 2006 census, its population was 374, in 116 families.

References 

Populated places in Tabas County